Tom Johnson (born July 15, 1964 in Evansville, IN) is the former IBF featherweight champion of the world.

Known as "Boom Boom", Johnson turned pro in 1986 and in 1991 challenged Manuel Medina for the IBF Featherweight Title, losing a technical decision.  In 1993 he rematched Medina and was able to win the title with a narrow split decision victory.  Johnson was able to successfully defend the title 11 times before losing the belt to the young phenom Naseem Hamed via 8th round TKO.  Johnson never challenged for a major title again, and retired in 2002 after being TKO'd by Jorge Páez.

In his personal life, Johnson is partnered with Sandra Reeves Jackson (aka Lois Reeves) of the Motown group, Martha and the Vandellas

 Record 51-10-2

External links
 

1964 births
Living people
Boxers from Indiana
Featherweight boxers
International Boxing Federation champions
World featherweight boxing champions
Sportspeople from Evansville, Indiana
American male boxers